Kapashera is the administrative headquarters and one of the three sub-division of the South West district of Delhi NCT, India. The office of Deputy Commissioner is located at Old Tax Terminal building

History
Kapashera Village has its own vast history from medieval times. Kapashera was previously known as NakiPur Kheda.
Rao Harnath Singh Yadav was the first citizen of this Village, he purchased 840 acre of the village land from person named Kapas in 1680s, every villager with Tondak gotra is his descendent. 
Kapashera was a agrarian village with a fertile land, socialised and hardworking citizens.

Transport

By Road

National Highway 8 (NH 8) is the nearest Highway and just 1 km away.

By Metro

Dwarka Metro Sec 21 is just 6 km away.

By Air

Indira Gandhi Airport is just 7 km away.

By Train

New Delhi Railway Station is the nearest Railway and it is 20 km away.

By Bus

Buses plying through Kapashera are Route No. 543, 539, 578, 543A, 718, 712, 804A, 729

Demand for Metro

A demand of Metro railway line has been raised from last 15 years but it has not been fulfilled by current or previous state governments.

Politics
MLA of Kapashera is Bhupendra Singh Joon from Aam Aadmi Party.
MCD Councillor is Aarti Yadav, AAP.

Demographics
 India census, Kapashera had a population of 74,073 of which 50,123 (68%) are males while 23,950 (32%) are females. Kapashera has an average literacy rate of 90.34%, higher than state average of 86.21%. Male literacy is around 92.35% while female literacy rate is 82.13%. In Kapashera, 13.72% of the population is under six years of age.

As of 2020, the village is believed to have a population of more than 5,00,00 due to frequent migration & industries being near Kapashera.

Fun N Food Village is one of the main attractions of Kapashera village.

Kapashera shares border with Gurgaon, Haryana.

Growth in Recent Decade
Kapashera has grown at an unprecedented rate because of rapid industrialization around the area such as Udhyog Vihar Industrial Area and Maruti Factory in Gurgaon.

The Area is also under DDA Redevelopment Zone and it is expected that it will grow even faster in this decade.

Due to Industrialisation , Migrants now have a sizable population and most of the natives are in the Rent Business.

In 2001, Population was 20,000 and in 2011,population was 75,000 , a 400% increase.
Now the city has population of 5,00,000.

Groundwater and Land Subsidence
A study published in Nature scientific report  reports that land is sinking down in Delhi due to groundwater overpumping.

References

Cities and towns in South West Delhi district
District subdivisions of Delhi